Kwong Wah Yit Poh or Kwong Wah Daily is a Malaysian Chinese daily that was founded on 20 December 1910 by Dr. Sun Yat-sen.

The idea of publishing the Kwang Hwa Pao or 'Glorious Chinese Newspaper' was originally conceived when Dr Sun, Hu Hanmin, Huang Xing and Wang Jingwei visited Penang in 1907. The plan was aborted when financial backing wavered due to the collapse of tin prices. The Yangon branch of the Tongmenghui took up the idea and started the Yan Kon Kwang Hwa Pao. After a short run, the Rangoon paper was banned by the British colonial government due to its radical stance. Subsequently, the Rangoon Tongmenghui leader Zhuang Yin'an came to Penang and a committee was formed to revive the Kwang Hwa Pao as a daily paper.

Renamed Kwong Wah Yit Poh, the newspaper was first printed at and published from at 120 Armenian Street, the current address of the Penang Philomatic Union. The first premises of the Kwong Wah Yit Poh is now the Sun Yat Sen Museum Penang. The house where the Kwong Wah Yit Poh was founded has been preserved as the Sun Yat-sen Museum Penang.

Kwong Wah Yit Poh is the oldest Chinese-language newspapers in Malaysia, outside of Mainland China, Hong Kong and Taiwan, as well as one of the world's oldest surviving Chinese newspaper (Ta Kung Pao is the oldest active Chinese-language newspaper in the world). However, it is not the first Chinese language newspaper in Malaysia.

The newspaper had ceased publication in 1927 for almost a decade, and then again in 1941 due to World War II, and its publication did not resume until 1946.

In 1936, Kwong Wah Yit Poh acquired Penang Sin Poe (established 1895), Penang's first Chinese newspaper which also had originally traced back the history of Kwong Wah Yit Poh. Despite the change in ownership, Penang Sin Poe continued to be published until 30 September 1941.

Kwong Wah Yit Poh went into a decline in the 1960s after the death of two directors. In the 1971, The Star began publication and had once worked together with Kwong Wah Yit Poh. However, the newspaper continued to make losses, and The Star became independent from Kwong Wah Yit Poh. The Star became a national daily newspaper in 1976, but the headquarters relocated to Kuala Lumpur in 1978 and then Petaling Jaya in 1981.

Despite being Malaysia's longest running Chinese-language newspaper, the daily is not recognised as a national newspaper, but it has the largest readership in the northern region.

See also 
 Other Chinese language newspapers in Malaysia:
 Sin Chew Daily
 Nanyang Siang Pau
 China Press, its sister publication
 Guang Ming Daily
 Oriental Daily News
 Related newspaper:
 The Star - a newspaper which had once worked together with Kwong Wah Yit Poh before split
 List of newspapers in Malaysia

References

External links 
 Official Website

Chinese-language mass media in Malaysia
Newspapers published in Malaysia
Newspapers established in 1910
1910 establishments in British Malaya